Captain Bay-Bay is a 1953 West German musical comedy film directed by Helmut Käutner and starring Hans Albers, Bum Krüger and Lotte Koch. It is in the style of an operetta film. It was shot at the Wiesbaden Studios and on location in Hamburg as well as Ischia and Naples in Italy. The film's sets were designed by the art directors Paul Markwitz and Fritz Maurischat.

Synopsis
On his wedding day a sea captain recounts his various adventures to his guests.

Cast
Hans Albers as Käpt'n Bay-Bay
Bum Krüger as Smutje
Lotte Koch as Hanna
Renate Mannhardt as Manuela
Angèle Durand as Goulou
Anneliese Kaplan as Antje
Rudolf Fernau as Dr. Mendez
Ernst Fritz Fürbringer as Prefect
Fritz Rémond Jr. as Blacky Blue
Robert Meyn as customs commander
Carsta Löck as Küster's wife
Erna Sellmer as Tante Emma
Maria Martinsen as Schwarze Witwe
Rudolf Schündler as Wüllmann
Willi Grill as Puvogel
Fritz Benscher as broadcast reporter
Francois Benga as Dr. Samuel

References

External links

1953 musical comedy films
German adventure comedy films
German musical comedy films
West German films
1950s adventure comedy films
Operetta films
Seafaring films
Films directed by Helmut Käutner
German films based on plays
German black-and-white films
1950s German films
Films shot in Hamburg
Films shot in Naples